Burning Desire is a posthumous compilation album by Jimi Hendrix, released on December 12, 2006 by Dagger Records. It contains instrumental studio jams and rough demos recorded in late 1969 and early 1970.  Backing Hendrix are drummer Buddy Miles and bassist Billy Cox, who recorded the live Band of Gypsys album (1970).

Track listing
All songs were written by Jimi Hendrix. All tracks recorded at Record Plant Studios.

Personnel
Jimi Hendrix – guitars
Buddy Miles – drums
Billy Cox – bass guitar

References

Compilation albums published posthumously
Jimi Hendrix compilation albums
2006 compilation albums
Dagger Records compilation albums